Johnston Community College (JCC) is a public community college in Smithfield, North Carolina. The  main campus has 11 student buildings, an auditorium capable of seating 1,011 people, a 4,800-square-foot multi-use/banquet hall, four vocational shops/labs, a  arboretum, and three ponds. Johnston Community College has off-campus centers throughout Johnston County, including the Cleveland Center, the Workforce Development Center, and the Howell Woods Environmental Learning Center, a  wildlife preserve, and a teaching facility.

JCC is the home of the North Carolina Truck Driver Training school, the oldest truck driver training program in the United States. JCC also offers the programs of the Johnston County Career and Technical Leadership Academy.

Accreditation
Johnston Community College is a member of the North Carolina Community College System and is accredited by the Commission on Colleges of the Southern Association of Colleges and Schools to award the certificate, diploma, and associate degree.

Athletics
The athletic teams at Johnston Community College, known as the Jaguars compete in two intercollegiate sports: 
Men's and women's golf
Men's and women's basketball

The men's basketball team was revived in 2016 along with the founding of a women's basketball team. Home games are held in the heart of Johnston County at the SRAC.

Johnston Community College is a part of the NJCAA.

Notable alumni 
 Tony Braswell, politician and businessman

References

External links
 Official website

Two-year colleges in the United States
North Carolina Community College System colleges
Educational institutions established in 1969
Universities and colleges accredited by the Southern Association of Colleges and Schools
Education in Johnston County, North Carolina
Buildings and structures in Johnston County, North Carolina
1969 establishments in North Carolina